Emmanuel Mayonnade (born 12 June 1983) is a French handball coach who currently serves as head coach of Metz Handball and previously the Dutch women's national team.

He coached the Netherlands at the 2019 World Women's Handball Championship.

Honours

Manager 
Clubs
Championnat de France:
Winner: 2016, 2017, 2018, 2019, 2022

Coupe de France:
Winner: 2009, 2017, 2019, 2022

EHF Challenge Cup:
Winner: 2011

Netherlands
 World Women's Handball Championship:
Winner: 2019

Individual
 IHF World Coach of the Year: 2019
 Championnat de France Best coach: 2010, 2016, 2017, 2018
 EHF Champions League Best coach: 2019, 2020

References

French handball coaches
1983 births
Living people
French expatriate sportspeople in the Netherlands
Sportspeople from Nouvelle-Aquitaine
Handball coaches of international teams